Parietobalaena is an extinct genus of baleen whale, belonging to the family Pelocetidae. Fossils are found in Miocene-aged marine strata in North America, Europe, Australia and Japan.

References

Notes

Sources 

 

 

 
 

 
 

Miocene cetaceans
Miocene mammals of Asia
Miocene mammals of Australia
Miocene mammals of Europe
Miocene mammals of North America
Miocene genus extinctions
Prehistoric cetacean genera
Fossil taxa described in 1924
Taxa named by Remington Kellogg